Nastätten is a municipality in the Rhein-Lahn-Kreis, in Rhineland-Palatinate, Germany. It is situated in the Taunus, approx. 25 km southeast of Koblenz, and 35 km northwest of Wiesbaden.

Nastätten is the seat of the Verbandsgemeinde ("collective municipality") Nastätten.

Sons and daughters of the city 

 Robert F. Wagner (1877-1953), US senator and founder of American social legislation, his homonymous son Robert F. Wagner Jr. was Mayor of New York from 1954 to 1965
 Harro Heuser (1927-2011), mathematician and author

References

Towns in Rhineland-Palatinate
Rhein-Lahn-Kreis